Sherwood Stewart and Kim Warwick were the defending champions, but did not participate this year.

Stefan Edberg and Anders Järryd won the title, defeating Jim Grabb and Jim Pugh 6–3, 6–4 in the final.

Seeds

Draw

Finals

Top half

Bottom half

References
Draw

Stockholm Open
1987 Grand Prix (tennis)